This article uses Logar transcription.

The Brda dialect, or Gorizia Hills dialect, is a Slovene dialect spoken in the Gorizia Hills in Slovenia and Italy. It is known for extreme vowel reduction in final position. It borders the Natisone Valley dialect to the north and the Karst dialect to the east, and Friulian to the west. The dialect belongs to the Littoral dialect group, and it evolved from Venetian–Karst dialect base.

It is spoken in a territory with around 6,000 Slovene speakers, most of whom have a degree of knowledge of the dialect.

Geographical distribution 
The dialect is spoken west of the Soča River in the Gorizia Hills, extending from Lig in the north, along the Soča River in the east, up to Oslavia and Gradiscutta in the south and to Dolegna del Collio in the west.

In Slovenia, the dialect is spoken in most of the territory of the Municipality of Brda (except for its northwesternmost strip, where the Natisone Valley dialect is spoken) and in the westernmost part of the Municipality of Kanal ob Soči. Notable settlements include Hum, Kojsko, Kozana, Šmartno, Medana, Dobrovo, Plave, and Anhovo. 

In Italy, it is spoken in the northeastern area of the Province of Gorizia, in the municipalities of San Floriano del Collio, and in part of the municipalities of Cormons and Dolegna del Collio. It is also spoken in the western suburbs of the town of Gorizia: in Piedimonte del Calvario, Piuma, and Oslavia.

Accentual changes 
The Brda dialect lost pitch accent, unlike the nearby Natisone Valley and Torre Valley dialects; however, some southeastern microdialects (especially around Kojsko) have developed new tonal oppositions, which are morphologically correlated. These dialects distinguish between circumflex and acute accent on long vowels; short ones always have the same pitch. The dialect is in the late stages of losing length oppositions. It has undergone two accent shifts—the  →  and  →  accent shift in most of its territory—but some locales retain the initial accentuation.

Phonology 
The Brda dialect has mostly uniform sounds for long vowels; however, for short vowels, sounds can vary drastically. The vowel  turned into . The vowel  turned into . Syllabic  turned into  and  turned into .

The vowel  before a stressed syllable usually turned into , although it also changes into . The vowels  and  before the stress turn into . Vowel  after the stress turned into .

Consonant changes are rather common in the Littoral dialects. The consonant  turned into  and into  at the end of a word. Final  turned into  in the west.

Morphology 
The Brda dialect has separate dual forms only in masculine o-stems in the nominative, vocative, and accusative cases; elsewhere they merged with the plural forms. The dialect uses the long infinitive, although final  is dropped, but the accent remains the same. Neuter nouns are feminized in the plural.

The dialect also has different endings for the third-person plural form in the present tense.

The greatest changes to morphology occurred around Kojsko, where the declension fundamentally changed. Because of vowel reduction, most endings were lost, and so different cases have different tones—either circumflex or acute—which helps determine the case.

References

Bibliography 

 
 

Slovene dialects